Colin Biart, also called Colin Biard, Nicolas Biart or Colin Byart or Nicolas Byart, was a French master mason, master builder, and architect, born in Amboise in 1460, active until 1515.

Biography 
Biart married at Beaugency in 1479. He started working in Amboise where he participated in the realization of the sets for the entrance of Margaret of Austria.

He also worked at the Château d'Amboise (1495–1496) with Guillaume Senault. He worked there again in 1508, and again in 1515.

After the collapse of the Pont Notre-Dame in Paris in 1499, he was called as a master mason and participated in the commission that chose to rebuild the bridge with stones in 1500.

, Marshal of France, asked him to intervene at the  while working on the Louis XII wing of Château de Blois, before 1510. It is possible that he was involved in the construction of the Longueville wing of Château de Châteaudun.

Georges d'Amboise, the archbishop of Rouen, brought him from Blois to build the Château de Gaillon from 1504, with his assistant, Guillaume Senault. At his request, he intervened on the Beurre (butter) tower of the Rouen Cathedral in 1506.

On the recommendation of the Archbishop of Rouen, he was summoned along with other master masons by the chapter of the Bourges Cathedral following the collapse of the north tower in 1508. In an investigation, he says that 

References

Bibliography 
 Auguste de Giradot, Hippolyte-Louis Durand, La Cathédrale de Bourges, description historique et archéologique, avec plan, notes et pièces justificatives, chez P.-A. Desrosiers imprimeur-éditeur, Moulins, 1849,  Read online
 Achille Deville, Comptes de dépenses de la construction du château de Gaillon  publiés d'après les registres manuscrits des trésoriers du Cardinal d'Amboise, Imprimerie nationale, Paris, 1850 Read online
 Joseph de Croy, Quelques renseignements inédits sur les maîtres maçons des châteaux de Chambord et d'Amboise, Librairie H. Herluison, Orléans, 1902,  Read online
 Louis de Grandmaison, Compte de la construction du château d'Amboise (1495-1496), in Congrès archéologique de France. 77th session held at Angers and Saumur. 1910, Paris, 1911  Read online
 Pierre Lesueur, Colin Biart, maître maçon de la Renaissance, in Gazette des beaux-arts , July 1929, volume 2, Procès-verbaux et mémoires,  Read online
 Étienne Hamon, Le cardinal Georges d'Amboise et ses architectes, under the direction of Fabienne Joubert, in L'artiste et le clerc: commandes artistiques des grands ecclésiastiques à la fin du Moyen Âge (XIVe-XVIe siècles), "Presses de l'université paris Sorbonne", Paris, 2006,  
 Étienne Hamon, Colin Biart, under the direction of Pascale Charron and Jean-Marie Guillouët, in Dictionnaire d'histoire de l'art du Moyen Âge occidental, Robert Laffont (series Bouquins), Paris, 2009,

External links 
 Colin Biart on Structurae
 Colin Biart on Encyclopédie Larousse

1460 births
Year of death missing
People from Amboise
Gothic architects
15th-century French architects
16th-century French architects